Charles Bigelow may refer to:

 Charles Bigelow (type designer) (born 1945), American type historian, professor, and designer
 Charles Bigelow (politician) (1805–1885), mayor of Houston in 1840–1841 
 Charles Bigelow (racing driver) (1872–1958), American auto racing driver
 Charles H. Bigelow (died 1862), American architect
 Charles A. Bigelow (1862–1912), American actor